The R55 is a north-south provincial route in Gauteng, South Africa that connects Sandton with Pretoria. It passes Woodmead, Kyalami, Olievenhoutbosch, Heuweloord, Sunderland Ridge, Erasmia, Laudium/Claudius, West Park, the Daspoort Tunnel and Danville. It connects with the M1, N14, and R80 highways. It is also designated as the P66-1 and K71 (newly constructed dual carriageway sections) by the Gauteng Provincial Government.

Route
The southern terminus of R55 begins as a t-junction with the M11/R101 Pretoria Main Road. It then crosses and interchanges the M1 De Villiers Graaff freeway/Ben Schoeman Highway as it heads northwards through Woodmead. Leaving Woodmead, it crosses under the N1 Highway (Western Bypass) before interchanging with Maxwell Drive (R564 Road) in Sunninghill. It continues into Barbeque Downs before crossing the Jukskei River into Kyalami where M39 Allandale Road intersects. Leaving the Kyalami Estate, the M71 Main Road t-junctions the route and they are co-signed for a few metres up to Crowthorne, where the M71 becomes the road eastwards towards Grand Central Airport. Continuing north-east, it passes through the Blue Hills agricultural holdings, crossing Summit Road (R562 Road) and entering Centurion, passing through the suburb of Olievenhoutbosch, where it becomes a dual carriageway. It then intersects the N14 Highway at Junction 317.

Shortly after crossing the N14, it intersects the R114 in the Heuweloord suburb of Centurion. Heading northwards, the M10 intersects the route from the west close to Sunderland Ridge and later the M24 from the east, close to the Zwartkops Raceway. Continuing to Laudium, the M26 intercepts the route just south of the suburb. Leaving Laudium towards the northeast, it enters Pretoria West as Quagga Road, where it intersects the M22 and stops being a dual carriageway. At this intersection, the R55 then turns north as Transoranje Road, passing through West Park and Proclaimation Hill, crossing the R104 and shortly thereafter the M4 Magalies Toll Freeway. The R55 Transoranje Road heads north through Danville where it passes through the Daspoort Tunnel.

Leaving the tunnel, it continues north through Claremont, Daspoort and Booysens, crossing the R80 Mabopane Highway intersection and after a short distance ends as a t-junction with Denyssen Avenue in Suiderberg, Northern Pretoria.

History/Future
Although parts of the road in Johannesburg were widened in 2005, other single-lane sections of the route, especially in Centurion, were in a dangerous state, due to the high volumes of traffic and presence of heavy vehicles causing the road surface to deteriorate.

Renovation of a section in Centurion between the N14 and M10/Wierda Road intersection near Sunderland Ridge began in 2007, with construction largely completed by September 2010. The large Monavoni Circle was replaced with traffic lights, and a dual carriageway was built in this section, with surfaced shoulders to replace the existing narrow two-lane single carriageway.

Also, as a result of a fatal accident the existing N14 offramp from Centurion was converted into a four-way stop temporarily, and traffic lights were later installed.

Extension of the 4 lane dual-carriageway, to replace the section between the M10/Wierda Road intersection and Erasmia, a narrow two-lane single carriageway, passing over the Hennops River, which was overloaded and had severely deteriorated, began in late 2010, and was largely completed by late 2012, along with the installation of lighting on the newly constructed sections, including the previously rebuilt section between Weirda Road and the N14. The remaining provincially maintained (existing) dual-carriageway stretch beyond Erasmia, and part of the municipality-owned section beyond Laudium to the Maunde Street entrance to Atteridgeville was rehabilitated in 2014.

Old routing through Johannesburg
There are a few roads in Johannesburg which have the R55 designation given to them.

Empire road from the Barry Hertzog Road junction eastwards across the M1 De Villiers Graaff Motorway and Jan Smuts Avenue has signs on the road indicating the R55 route (although it is designated as the M71).

In Hillbrow, the road starting as Claim Street southwards, becoming Mooi Street in Johannesburg CBD, also has signposts on it indicating the R55 route. From Johannesburg Central south up to Wemmer Pan (where the road meets the western terminus of the N17 Highway), together with being called the M11 road, may also be called the R55 road.

References

External links
 Routes Travel Info

Provincial routes in South Africa
55
Streets and roads of Johannesburg